Jay Dean Haas (born December 2, 1953) is an American professional golfer formerly of the PGA Tour who now plays on the PGA Tour Champions.

Early life and amateur career
Haas was born in St. Louis, Missouri, and grew up in Belleville, Illinois. He attended Wake Forest University and was a member of the NCAA Championship team of the middle 1970s with Curtis Strange and Bob Byman that Golf World has called "the greatest college team of all time". He won the individual championship in 1975.

Professional career
Haas turned professional in 1976 and had a solid career on the PGA Tour, winning nine times between 1978 and 1993. He had a resurgence in 2003, when he finished in the top 30 on the money list for the first time since 1995 and made the United States Presidents Cup team. The following year he was one of Hal Sutton's two captain's picks for the Ryder Cup, and made his third appearance in that event.

Haas was known for being one of the most consistent players on the PGA Tour over the course of his career and ended up playing 799 events. He is only four starts off Mark Brooks' record. He has made the cut 593 times on the PGA Tour, more than any other player. Haas has the distinction of playing in 87 majors without a win. 

Haas was eligible to play in Champions Tour (now PGA Tour Champions) events from the start of the 2004 season and he lost to Hale Irwin by one stroke at the Senior PGA Championship in his first appearance at that level. He was still featured in the top 20 of the Official World Golf Ranking after his 50th birthday. In 2005, he won twice on the Champions Tour, while also continuing to play regularly on the PGA Tour. In April 2006, he won back to back events on the Champions Tour and the following month he won a playoff at the Oak Tree Golf Club with Brad Bryant at the Senior PGA Championship to claim his first senior major and he went on to top the 2006 Champions Tour money list. He was named the Champions Tour Player of the Year in 2006 as well. Haas won the 2008 Charles Schwab Cup to win two out of the last three cups.

After winning the Greater Hickory Classic at Rock Barn in September 2009, Haas won his third senior major and 14th Champions Tour event in October at the Constellation Energy Senior Players Championship. He came from 5 strokes behind with a final-round 6-under-par 64 to win by 1 over 54-hole leader Tom Watson. In June 2012, Haas won his 16th title on the Champions Tour, cruising to a five-stroke victory over Larry Mize and Kirk Triplett at the Principal Charity Classic. In October 2016, Haas won the Toshiba Classic in a playoff with Bart Bryant. He became the second-oldest player to win a PGA Tour Champions event at age ; the oldest being then Mike Fetchick at 63 years.

At the 2022 Zurich Classic, he at 68 team with his son Bill became the oldest golfer ever to make the cut. His son Bill made birdie at the final hole to preserve a place in golf history.

Haas comes from a distinguished family of golfers. He is a nephew of 1968 Masters winner Bob Goalby, and has several other relations in golf including his second son Bill who has played on the PGA Tour since 2006. His oldest son Jay Jr., brother Jerry Haas, and brother-in-law Dillard Pruitt also played on the PGA Tour.

He was voted the 2006 Bob Jones Award, the highest honor given by the United States Golf Association in recognition of distinguished sportsmanship in golf. In February 2005, he received the Payne Stewart Award, and in April 2005, he received the Murray Award for his cooperation with the media.

Haas currently resides in Greenville, South Carolina.

Professional wins (33)

PGA Tour wins (9)

PGA Tour playoff record (3–0)

Other wins (6)
1976 Missouri Open
1982 Spalding Invitational
1991 Mexican Open
1996 Franklin Templeton Shark Shootout (with Tom Kite)
2004 CVS Charity Classic (with son Bill Haas)
2012 CVS Caremark Charity Classic (with Morgan Pressel)

PGA Tour Champions wins (18)

PGA Tour Champions playoff record (3–2)

Results in major championships

LA = Low amateur
CUT = missed the half-way cut
"T" indicates a tie for a place

Summary

Most consecutive cuts made – 17 (1981 PGA – 1986 Masters)
Longest streak of top-10s – 2 (1995 Masters – 1995 U.S. Open)

Results in The Players Championship

CUT = missed the halfway cut
WD = withdrew
DQ = disqualified
"T" indicates a tie for a place

Results in World Golf Championships

QF, R16, R32, R64 = Round in which player lost in match play
"T" = Tied

Senior major championships

Wins (3)

Results timeline
Results not in chronological order before 2022.

CUT = missed the halfway cut
"T" indicates a tie for a place
NT = No tournament due to COVID-19 pandemic

U.S. national team appearances
Amateur
Walker Cup: 1975 (winners)

Professional
Ryder Cup: 1983 (winners), 1995, 2004
Presidents Cup: 1994 (winners), 2003 (tie), 2015 (non-playing captain)
UBS Cup: 2004 (winners)
Wendy's 3-Tour Challenge (representing Champions Tour): 2004 (PGA Tour), 2005 (winners), 2006, 2007, 2008 (winners), 2009, 2011 (winners)

See also
Fall 1976 PGA Tour Qualifying School graduates
List of golfers with most PGA Tour Champions wins

References

External links

American male golfers
Wake Forest Demon Deacons men's golfers
PGA Tour golfers
PGA Tour Champions golfers
Ryder Cup competitors for the United States
Winners of senior major golf championships
Golfers from St. Louis
Golfers from South Carolina
Sportspeople from Belleville, Illinois
Sportspeople from Greenville, South Carolina
1953 births
Living people